F91 may refer to :
 F91 Dudelange, a football club, based in Dudelange in southern Luxembourg
 Mobile Suit Gundam F91, a 1991 animated film
 HMS Brazen (F91), a 1981 British Royal Navy Type 22 frigate
 HMS Murray (F91), a British Royal Navy Blackwood class second-rate anti-submarine frigate
 Republic XF-91 Thunderceptor, a rocket-jet hybrid interceptor
 Casio F-91W, a common and inexpensive digital watch, claimed by some to be associated with terrorism
 The McCarthy 91 function, a recursively defined mathematical function
and also:
 Conduct disorders ICD-10 code